"Fly Away from Here" is a 2001 power ballad by Aerosmith. It was the second single on their album, Just Push Play. It was written by Aerosmith songwriters Marti Frederiksen and Todd Chapman. The song is a ballad about wanting to get away or escape with a loved one. It failed to make a significant impact on the charts, but did receive some airplay on adult contemporary varieties.

Music video
The video for the song, directed by Joseph Kahn, was very futuristic and high-tech.  The video also stars the actress Jessica Biel, and Steven Tyler's youngest daughter Chelsea portraying Steven as a child in this video.

Track listing
 "Fly Away from Here (Radio Remix Edit)"
 "Fly Away from Here (Album Version)"
 "Fly Away from Here (Rock Remix Edit)"
 "I Don't Want to Miss a Thing (Armageddon Version)"

Personnel
Steven Tyler – lead vocals
Tom Hamilton – bass
Joey Kramer – drums
Joe Perry – lead guitar, backing vocals
Brad Whitford – rhythm guitar
Additional personnel
Jim Cox – piano
Paul Santo – Kurzweil

Charts

Release History

References

Aerosmith songs
2001 singles
Hard rock ballads
Music videos directed by Joseph Kahn
Songs written by Marti Frederiksen
Columbia Records singles
2001 songs